Sir Sidney Patrick Shelley, 8th Baronet (18 January 1880 – 25 July 1965) was an English professional soldier.

A great-nephew of the poet Percy Bysshe Shelley, Shelley was born to Lt. Col. Sir Charles Shelley, 5th Baronet and Lady Mary Jane Jemima Shelley (née Stopford), daughter of James Stopford, 5th Earl of Courtown. He was educated at Wellington College. As a soldier he served in the Second Boer War, and in World War I as Captain in the Hampshire Yeomanry.

References

1880 births
1965 deaths
Baronets in the Baronetage of the United Kingdom
Shelley baronets, of Castle Goring